Rugby School is a public school (English fee-charging boarding school for pupils aged 13–18) in Rugby, Warwickshire, England.

Founded in 1567 as a free grammar school for local boys, it is one of the oldest independent schools in Britain. Up to 1667, the school remained in comparative obscurity. Its re-establishment by Thomas Arnold during his time as Headmaster, from 1828 to 1841, was seen as the forerunner of the Victorian public school. It was one of nine prestigious schools investigated by the Clarendon Commission of 1864 and later regulated as one of the seven schools included in the Public Schools Act 1868. Originally a boys school, it became fully co-educational in 1992.

The school's alumni – or "Old Rugbeians" – include a UK prime minister, several bishops, prominent poets, scientists, writers and soldiers.

Rugby School is the birthplace of rugby football.

History

Rugby School was founded in 1567 as a provision in the will of Lawrence Sheriff, who had made his fortune supplying groceries to Queen Elizabeth I of England. Since Lawrence Sheriff lived in Rugby and the neighbouring Brownsover, the school was intended to be a free grammar school for the boys of those towns. Up to 1667, the school remained in comparative obscurity. Its history during that trying period is characterised mainly by a series of lawsuits between the Howkins family (descendants of the founder's sister), who tried to defeat the intentions of the testator, and the masters and trustees, who tried to carry them out. A final decision was handed down in 1667, confirming the findings of a commission in favour of the trust, and henceforth the school maintained a steady growth. Under the headmastership of Henry Holyoake (from 1688 to 1731) the school became more than simply a local concern, and began to take on national importance. By the end of the 17th century, there were pupils from every part of England attending the school.

The school was originally based in a wooden schoolhouse on Church Street opposite St Andrew's Church, which incorporated Lawrence Sheriff's former house. By the 1740s this building was in poor condition, and the school looked to relocate to new premises. In 1750, the school moved to its current location to the south of the town centre, when it purchased a former Manor House at the south of High Street; this became the Master's house, a new schoolhouse was built alongside. The current school buildings date from the 19th and early 20th centuries.

Dr Henry Ingles, who was Headmaster between 1794 and 1806, was known for his strict discipline, and gained the nickname "The Black Tiger". His time as Headmaster is most notable for the 'Great Rebellion' of 1797: It started when Ingles heard one of the boys shoot a cork gun, and the boy told him that Mr Rowell, a grocer had supplied the gunpowder. Mr Rowell denied this, and as a result the boy Astley was flogged by Ingles, the boys retaliated by smashing Mr Rowell's windows, and Ingles insisted that the boys pay for the damages. This provoked a full-scale riot, in which the boys blew off doors, smashed windows and burned furniture and books. As the other Masters were away, Ingles called on help from the townsfolk. A party of recruiting soldiers and some townsfolk advanced on the rioters, who retreated onto a moated island on the school grounds. The Riot Act was read out by a local justice of the peace, calling on the boys to surrender, and as this caused a distraction, a group of soldiers waded across the moat from the rear, and took the boys prisoner.  

Rugby School's most famous headmaster was Thomas Arnold, from 1828 to 1841, who's emphasis on moral and religious principle, was widely admired and was seen as the blueprint for Victorian public schools. Arnold's period as headmaster is immortalised in Thomas Hughes 1857 novel Tom Brown's School Days. In the Victorian period, Rugby School saw several further Headmasters of some distinction, these included Frederick Temple (1858-1869) who would later become the Archbishop of Canterbury, John Percival (1887-1895) after whom the Percival Guildhouse is named, and Herbert Armitage James (1895-1910)

In 1845, a committee of Rugby schoolboys, William Delafield Arnold, W. W. Shirley and Frederick Hutchins, wrote the "Laws of Football as Played At Rugby School", the first published set of laws for any code of football.

Rugby was one of the nine prestigious schools investigated by the Clarendon Commission of 1861–64 (the schools under scrutiny being Eton, Charterhouse, Harrow, Shrewsbury, Westminster, and Winchester, and two day schools: St Paul's and Merchant Taylors). Rugby went on to be included in the Public Schools Act 1868, which ultimately related only to the seven boarding schools.

From the early days of the school, the pupils were divided into "Foundationers" i.e. boys who lived in Rugby and surrounding villages who received schooling for free, as per Sheriff's original bequest, and "Non-Foundationers"; boys from outside the Rugby area who paid fees and were boarders. Non-Foundationers were admitted from the early history of the school as they helped to pay the bills. Gradually, as the schools reputation grew, fee-paying Non-Foundationers became dominant, and local boys benefitted less and less from Sheriff's original intentions. By the latter part of the 19th century it was no longer desirable to have local boys attending a prestigious public school and so a new school – Lawrence Sheriff Grammar School – was founded in 1878, in order to continue Sheriff's original bequest for a free school for local boys.

On several occasions in the late 19th century, Rugby School was visited by the French educator Pierre de Coubertin, who would later cite the school as one of the main inspirations for his most notable achievement, the founding of the modern Olympic Games in 1896.

In 1975 two girls were admitted to the sixth form, and the first girls’ house opened three years later, followed by three more. In 1992, the first 13-year-old girls arrived, and in 1995 Rugby had its first-ever Head Girl, Louise Woolcock, who appeared on the front page of The Times. In September 2003 the last girls’ house was added. Today, total enrolment of day pupils, from forms 4 to 12, numbers around 800.

Rugby football

The game of Rugby football owes its name to the school.

The legend of William Webb Ellis and the origin of the game is commemorated by a plaque. The story is that Webb Ellis was the first to pick up a football and run with it, and thus invent a new sport. However, the sole source of the story is Matthew Bloxam, a former pupil but not a contemporary of Webb Ellis. In October 1876, four years after the death of Webb Ellis, in a letter to the school newspaper The Meteor he quotes an unknown friend relating the story to him. He elaborated on the story four years later in another letter to The Meteor, but shed no further light on its source. Richard Lindon, a boot and shoemaker who had premises across the street from the school's main entrance in Lawrence Sheriff Street, is credited with the invention of the "oval" rugby ball, the rubber inflatable bladder and the brass hand pump.

There were no standard rules for football in Webb Ellis's time at Rugby (1816–1825) and most varieties involved carrying the ball. The games played at Rugby were organised by the pupils and not the masters, the rules being a matter of custom and not written down. They were frequently changed and modified with each new intake of students.

Rugby fives 

Rugby fives is a handball game, similar to squash, played in an enclosed court. It has similarities with Winchester fives (a form of Wessex fives) and Eton fives.

It is most commonly believed to be derived from Wessex fives, a game played by Thomas Arnold, Headmaster of Rugby, who had played Wessex fives when a boy at Lord Weymouth's Grammar, now Warminster School. The open court of Wessex fives, built in 1787, is still in existence at Warminster School although it has fallen out of regular use.

Rugby fives is played between two players (singles) or between two teams of two players each (doubles), the aim being to hit the ball above a 'bar' across the front wall in such a way that the opposition cannot return it before a second bounce. The ball is slightly larger than a golf ball, leather-coated and hard. Players wear leather padded gloves on both hands, with which they hit the ball.

Rugby fives continues to have a good following with tournaments being run nationwide, presided over by the Rugby Fives Association.

Cricket

The school has produced a number of cricketers who have gone onto play Test and first-class cricket. The school has played host to two major matches, the first of which was a Twenty20 match between Warwickshire and Glamorgan in the 2013 Friends Life t20. The second match was a List-A one-day match between Warwickshire and Sussex in the 2015 Royal London One-Day Cup, though it was due to host a match in the 2014 competition, however this was abandoned. In the 2015 match, William Porterfield scored a century, with a score of exactly 100.

Houses 
Rugby School has both day and boarding-pupils, the latter in the majority. Originally it was for boys only, but girls have been admitted to the sixth form since 1975. It went fully co-educational in 1992. The school community is divided into houses.

Academic life 
Pupils beginning Rugby in the F Block (first year) study various subjects. In a pupil's second year (E block), they do nine subjects which are for their GCSEs, this is the same for the D Block (GCSE year). The school then provides standard A-levels in 29 subjects. Students at this stage have the choice of taking three or four subjects and are also offered the opportunity to take an extended project. The School also offers taking the IB Diploma Programme.  Oxbridge acceptance percentage in 2007 was 10.4%

Scholarships
The Governing Body provides financial benefits with school fees to families unable to afford them. Parents of pupils who are given a Scholarship are capable of obtaining a 10% fee deduction, although more than one scholarship can be awarded to one student.

Fees 

Boarder fees per term: £13,970
Day pupil fees per term: £8,770

Alumni 

There have been a number of notable Old Rugbeians including the purported father of the sport of Rugby William Webb Ellis, the inventor of Australian rules football Tom Wills, the war poets Rupert Brooke and John Gillespie Magee, Jr., Prime Minister Neville Chamberlain, author and mathematician Lewis Carroll, poet and cultural critic Matthew Arnold, the author and social critic Salman Rushdie (who said of his time there: "Almost the only thing I am proud of about going to Rugby school was that Lewis Carroll went there too.") and the Irish writer and republican Francis Stuart. The Indian concert pianist, music composer and singer Adnan Sami also studied at Rugby School. Matthew Arnold's father Thomas Arnold, was a headmaster of the school. Philip Henry Bahr (later Sir Philip Henry Manson-Bahr), a zoologist and medical doctor, World War I veteran, was President of both Royal Society of Tropical Medicine and Hygiene and Medical Society of London, and vice-president of the British Ornithologists' Union. Richard Barrett Talbot Kelly joined the army in 1915, straight after leaving the school, earned a Military Cross during the First World War, and later returned to the school as Director of Art.

Rugbeian Society
The Rugbeian Society is for former pupils at the school. An Old Rugbeian is sometimes referred to as an OR.

The purposes of the society are to encourage and help Rugbeians in interacting with each other and to strengthen the ties between ORs and the school.

In 2010 the Rugbeians reached the semi-finals of the Public Schools' Old Boys' Sevens tournament, hosted by the Old Silhillians to celebrate the 450th anniversary of fellow Warwickshire public school, Solihull School.

Buildings and architecture

The buildings of Rugby School date from the 18th and 19th century with some early 20th-century additions. The oldest buildings are the Old Quad Buildings and the School House the oldest parts of which date from 1748, but were mostly built between 1809 and 1813, designed by Henry Hakewill, these are Grade II* listed. Most of the current landmark buildings date from the Victorian era and were designed by William Butterfield: The most notable of these is the chapel, dating from 1872, which is Grade I listed. Butterfield's New Quad buildings are Grade II* listed and date from 1867 to 1885. The Grade II* War Memorial chapel, designed by Sir Charles Nicholson, dates to 1922. Nicholson was educated at the school from the late-1870s.

The Temple Speech Room on Barby Road was named after former Rugby headmaster, Frederick Temple, It was opened on 3 July 1909 by King Edward VII. Designed by Thomas Graham Jackson, it is grade II listed. The Macready Theatre is based in a prominent Victorian building on Lawrence Sheriff Street which was built as classrooms in 1885, in 1975 it was converted into a theatre, in 2018, it was opened to the general public.

Head Masters

Thomas Arnold

Rugby's most famous headmaster was Thomas Arnold, appointed in 1828; he executed many reforms to the school curriculum and administration. Arnold's and the school's reputations were immortalised through Thomas Hughes' book Tom Brown's School Days.

David Newsome writes about the new educational methods employed by Arnold in his book, 'Godliness and Good Learning' (Cassell 1961). He calls the morality practised at Arnold's school muscular Christianity. Arnold had three principles: religious and moral principle, gentlemanly conduct and academic performance. George Mosse, former professor of history at the University of Wisconsin-Madison, lectured on Arnold's time at Rugby. According to Mosse, Thomas Arnold created an institution which fused religious and moral principles, gentlemanly conduct, and learning based on self-discipline. These morals were socially enforced through the "Gospel of work." The object of education was to produce "the Christian gentleman," a man with good outward appearance, playful but earnest, industrious, manly, honest, virginal pure, innocent, and responsible.

John Percival

In 1888 the appointment of Marie Bethell Beauclerc by Percival was the first appointment of a female teacher in an English boys' public school and the first time shorthand had been taught in any such school. The shorthand course was popular with one hundred boys in the classes.

Controversy 
In September 2005, the school was one of fifty independent schools operating independent school fee-fixing, in breach of the Competition Act, 1998. All of the schools involved were ordered to abandon this practice, pay a nominal penalty of £10,000 each and to make ex-gratia payments totalling three million pounds into a trust designed to benefit pupils who attended the schools during the period in respect of which fee information had been shared.

However, the head of the Independent Schools Council declared that independent schools had always been exempt from anti-cartel rules applied to business, were following a long-established procedure in sharing the information with each other and that they were unaware of the change to the law (on which they had not been consulted). She wrote to John Vickers, the OFT director-general, stating "They are not a group of businessmen meeting behind closed doors to fix the price of their products to the disadvantage of the consumer. They are schools that have quite openly continued to follow a long-established practice because they were unaware that the law had changed."

See also
List of schools in the West Midlands
Four Rugby Boys

References

Further reading
 Carter, George David. "The extent to which the novel" Tom Brown's Schooldays",(1857), by Thomas Hughes, accurately reflects the ideas, purposes and policies of Dr. Thomas Arnold in Rugby School, 1828–1842." (MA thesis, Kansas State U, 1967).  online
 Hope-Simpson, John Barclay. Rugby Since Arnold: A History of Rugby School from 1842. (1967).
 Mack, Edward Clarence. Public schools and British opinion, 1780 to 1860: An examination of the relationship between contemporary ideas and the evolution of an English institution (1938), comparison with other elite schools
 Neddam*, Fabrice. "Constructing masculinities under Thomas Arnold of Rugby (1828–1842): gender, educational policy and school life in an early‐Victorian public school." Gender and Education 16.3 (2004): 303–326.
 Rouse, W.H.D.  A history of Rugby School (1898) online.

External links

 

 
Boarding schools in Warwickshire
Member schools of the Headmasters' and Headmistresses' Conference
Racquets venues
Private schools in Warwickshire
Educational institutions established in the 1560s
1567 establishments in England
Schools in Rugby, Warwickshire
World Rugby Hall of Fame inductees
Cricket grounds in Warwickshire
William Butterfield buildings
Elinor Lyon